Ressources is the fourth studio album and third major label album by French-Israeli singer Amir Haddad. It was released on 16 October 2020 in France by Warner Music Group. The album includes the singles "La fête" and "On verra bien".

Singles
"La fête" was released as the lead single from the album on 10 June 2020. The song peaked at number 149 on the French Singles Chart. "On verra bien" was released as the second single from the album on 2 October 2020. "Carousel" was released as the third single from the album on 8 April 2021.

Critical reception
Jonathan Vautrey from Wiwibloggs said, "Amir took a break from the music scene in November 2019 to write the next chapter of his life, and this has now resulted in Ressources. [...] Overall, Amir delivers a nice collection of tracks that complement each other and his vocal style well."

Track listing

Charts

Weekly charts

Year-end charts

Release history

References

2020 albums
Amir Haddad albums